This is a list of computer magazines published in Spain.

List of computer magazines 

 Arroba
 CiberSur
 Computer Hoy
 Gaceta Tecnológica
 Hobby consolas
 Linux Magazine
 Micromanía
 Novática
 PC Actual
 PC Forma
 PC Pro
 PC World
 Linux+
 Linux Actual
 Linux User
 Superjuegos
 Todo Linux

Defunct 

 8000 Plus
 Amiga World
 Amigos del Amstrad
 Amstrad Acción
 Amstrad Educativo
 Amstrad Mania
 Amstrad Personal
 Amstrad Sinclair Ocio
 Amstrad User
 Computer Music
 CPC Attack
 CPC User
 FamilyPC
 Megaocio
 MicroHobby
 Microhobby Amstrad Especial
 Microhobby Amstrad Semanal
 Mundo Amstrad
 PC Magazine
 PC Manía
 PC Soft
 PC User
 PC Útil
 PC World
 PCW Plus
 Programación Actual
 Programando mi Amstrad
 Solo Programadores
 Super máquinas
 Todo sobre el Amstrad
 Tu Micro Amstrad
 Users
 Xtreme PC

See also
 List of magazines in Spain

Computer magazines
Computer magazines published in Spain
Computer magazines